is a Japanese former freestyle swimmer who competed in the 1984 Summer Olympics and in the 1988 Summer Olympics.

References

1967 births
Living people
Japanese female freestyle swimmers
Olympic swimmers of Japan
Swimmers at the 1984 Summer Olympics
Swimmers at the 1988 Summer Olympics
Asian Games medalists in swimming
Swimmers at the 1982 Asian Games
Swimmers at the 1986 Asian Games
Asian Games gold medalists for Japan
Asian Games silver medalists for Japan
Medalists at the 1982 Asian Games
Medalists at the 1986 Asian Games
20th-century Japanese women